NCAA March Madness 2002 is the 2001 installment in the NCAA March Madness series. Former Duke and Miami Heat player Shane Battier is featured on the cover.

Modes
Create-a-Player
Single Game
First College basketball game for the PlayStation 2
Tournament Mode
Roster Management

Reception

The game received "mixed" reviews according to the review aggregation website Metacritic.

See also
NBA Live 2002

References

External links
 

2001 video games
Basketball video games
EA Sports games
NCAA video games
North America-exclusive video games
PlayStation 2 games
PlayStation 2-only games
Video games developed in the United States